Section 4 of the Education Act 1944 set-up two Central Advisory Councils for Education, one for England and one for Wales and Monmouthshire. The purpose of the councils was to advise the Minister of Education upon matters connected with educational theory and practice, the advices were used to refine educational policy and develop educational institutes.  Starting with a terms of reference, the councils would carryout an enquiry and produce a report which would be submitted to the Minister of Education who could choose to publish the report.

Purpose of the councils 

Rab Butler who was  responsible for passing the Education Act 1944 (aka the Butler Act), elaborated on the purpose of the councils when the bill was moved for a second reading in parliament:

To "hold aloft the torch of true learning" metaphorically described the outcome from applying current educational theory and best practice to improve education. To achieve such an outcome, evidence & research based advice was needed to influence government thinking, justify policy change, and set priorities so leading to the reallocation of resources used for education. The enquiries by the councils followed by the publication of their findings in reports were simply the first step to achieving the change needed to improve children's lives for the better.  

The reports, socialised out the current practices in education, both good and bad.  They often legitimised some sensible ideas for educational change which were previously considered radical & progressive by the educational establishment. They had an unequalled ability  to obtain a broad consensus for change across both the public and education profession.  They established a blueprint for best practice and encouraged its adoption and they set parents expectations for the education of their children. Most importantly of all, they economically demonstrated the relationship between education and growth which helped to justify the significant post-war expansion in public education services. The reports often achieved their aims slowly by influencing government though exerting political pressure and extracting commitments which eventually led to the change needed to improve the lives of children. 

The councils were learned, independent and respected. They received and absorbed evidence across a diverse range of opinions and undertook detailed research and surveys to support their findings.  The result was the reports often became the definitive documents on a particular education service and were sometimes best sellers in their own rights.    

To this purpose and over their 22 year lifespan, the councils investigated some of the most pertinent educational questions of the time with the results of their most important enquiries being published in reports by His Majesty's Stationery Office (HMSO).  In addition the Ministry of Education sometimes received advice in the form of reports from the councils but then chose not to  publish, these are on public records at the National Archives in Kew.

Composition of the Councils 
The Minister of Education appointed the chairman  & members for each council and supplied the secretariat from the Ministry of Education.  The Education Act obliged the minister to appoint both persons who had experience of the public education system as well as persons who had an experience of educational institutions not forming part of that system, the original aim was to enlist the help of representatives of different aspects of the national life, whether they be industrial, scientific or cultural.  This resulted in an eclectic mix of people on the council as evidenced by the membership of the inaugural English council, which was appointed by Rab Butler, the first Minister of Education: -

History 
The constitution of the councils only changed organically over the first decade as originally the tenure of membership was set on a rotating basis allowing for some change to the council composition whilst still ensuring continuity, this organic change included the fact some councillors resigned of their own volition or passed away and those vacancies were filled, during this historical phase there was only one change in chairman as Sir Fred Clark was replaced by Samuel Gurney-Dixon.

This way of operating changed in 1956 when Sir David Eccles started to re-constitute the main English councils for each new enquiry, subsequently  it was reconstituted 3 times by the Education Minister of the time: - 

 In March 1956, by the minister, Sir David Eccles under the new chairman, Sir Geoffrey Crowther
 In March 1961, by the minister, Sir David Eccles under the new chairman, Lord Amory, who resigned during his tenure forcing the vice-chairman, John Newsom to then step-up to chairman
 In August 1963, by the minister Sir Edward Boyle under the new chairwoman, Lady Bridget Plowden, with John Newsom dropping back down to vice-chairman.

Organisation 
The councils were public bodies within the government of the United Kingdom, for context : -  

 The role of Minister of Education was created under the Education Act.
 The Prime Minister appointed a member of parliament to the role.
 The Education Minister produced an annual report for parliament.
 The Education Minister was scrutinised by parliament and its committees.

The two advisory councils fitted into this organisation as follows: - 
The central advisory councils were created under the Education Act so they were statutory.
 The Education Minister appointed the chair and members of the council.
 The Education Minister provided terms of reference for the enquiries.
The councils could also set their own terms of reference and could make independent enquiries as they saw fit.
By statute the annual report of the Ministry of Education included information on the workings of the councils.

 This information enabled parliament and its committees to scrutinise the work of the councils.

This model resulted in the councils being partially autonomous rather than completely sub-ordinate to the Minister of Education.

Remits of the published enquiries 
Each of the  enquiries undertaken by the councils were under a terms of reference (aka remit) which defined the scope & bounds of each enquiry. The councils either enquired on the questions raised by the minister or on questions independently identified by the councils themselves.

Own Remits 
The unique difference between the councils and the commission which proceeded it or the committees which followed was the ability to set its own terms of reference, independently of the minister of education.

Major Published Reports

English Publications 
The following are the six reports published by the English council: -

Welsh Publications 
The following are the ten reports published by the Welsh council: -

Unpublished enquiries

England 
The English council additionally completed five enquiries where the Minister of Education chose not to publish the reports, also one enquiry completed but with just a memoranda and one enquiry was not completed: - 
1947 - 1948; - Education of the young worker (report produced - unpublished).
1948 - 1951; - The crisis in the primary school (report produced - unpublished).
1949 - 1949; - County College (memoranda produced - unpublished).
1948 - 1950; - Relations between technical and general education. 
1951 - 1954; - Premature leaving from secondary schools (report produced - unpublished). 
1949 - 1952; - The relation between school and university (report produced - unpublished). 
1950 - 1954; - The age of compulsory school attendance (report produced - unpublished).

Wales 
The Welsh council was smaller than its larger English counter-part and dealt with less significant enquiries but all ten of its enquiries resulted in reports which were all published.

Dissolution 
After the issuance of the Plowden report, the final meeting of the central advisory council for education (England) was held on 16th October 1966, with the tenure of all the members allowed to expire on 30th November 1966.  Similarly, after the issuance of the Gittins report, the equivalent council for Wales met in March 1967 and the tenure of their members was also allowed to expire shortly afterwards.  Neither council was ever re-constituted again but the statute under which they were instituted [section (4) of the Education Act 1944] remained in law until finally repealed on 1st November 1996.

Replacement bodies 
The educational advisory function was instead carried out by a multitude of non-statutory advisory bodies who were indirectly constituted at the behest of Ministers rather than being constituted directly under an act of parliament as were the two councils.  In 1971, the Secretary of State for Education & Science (Margaret Thatcher) explained the change to the 'advisory machinery' and named many of the bodies who had replaced the work done by the two statutory advisory councils: -     

Permanent (standing) advisory councils with thematic remits: -      

 Established 1948; - National Advisory Council on Education for Industry and Commerce     
 Established 1958; - National Advisory Council on Art Education     
 Established 1964; - The Schools Council
 Established 1967; - The National Council for Educational Technology

Ad-hoc (expert) committees with single issue remits: - 

 Reported 1955; - Underwood Committee on Maladjusted Children
 Reported 1960; - Anderson committee  on awards to students
 Reported 1960; - Albemarle committee on the youth service
 Reported 1963; - Robbins committee on higher education
 Reported 1968; - Summerfield Committee on psychologists in education services
 Reported 1972; - James Committee on teacher training
Reported 1973; - Russell Committee on adult education

Reasons for replacement 

The reasons the statutory councils were dissolved and replaced by non-statutory advisory bodies were manifold.  Some education ministers such as Anthony Crosland, did not want an independent body contemplating the long-term vision needed for education instead the ministry of education under political control should carryout this fundamental activity and so the internal advisory capability of the ministry was improved.  By their nature, the reports were often publicly critical of the status quo which was often construed as criticism of the education minister which was not appreciated.  Ministers no longer considered it necessary for the councils to come-up with their own terms of reference and they were not keen on funding such work. The councils were subject to statutory reporting which led to more parliamentary scrutiny than with non-statutory advisory bodies.

Notes

Citations

References 

Legislation
 
 
 

Reports (England)
 
 
 
 
 
 
 
 

Reports (Wales)
 
 
 
 
 
 
 
 
 
 
 
 

Hansard
 
 
 
 
 
 
 
 

UK government sources
 
 

National archives
 
 
 
 
 
   
 
 
 
 

Academics

Further reading 
 
 
 

Education in England
Education in Wales